Penguicon is a convention in southeastern Michigan designed originally to mix the communities of the science fiction fandom and Linux user groups. In addition to educational panels on science fiction in the media, attendees participate in professional and beginner-level panels on Linux and open-source software. Penguicon takes its name both from a Monty Python sketch and from Tux, the penguin mascot of Linux.

Penguicon is held in the spring in the Detroit, Michigan metropolitan area. The venue, a hotel, has changed from year to year, but since 2014 the event has been held at the Westin Southfield Hotel in Southfield, Michigan.

Since its founding, Penguicon has expanded its focus to include panels and events for foodies, cosplay, filk music (the folk music of science fiction fandom), gaming, and makerspaces. Penguicon has been described as a place where "hackers, makers, foodies, open source software junkies, anime buffs, and science fiction fans of all ages and backgrounds come together in a hotel for a weekend and totally blow the roof off."

Along with the panels, the convention has hosted Artemis spaceship bridge simulations, biohacking presentations, retrogaming rooms, and a life-size Operation game board.

Working alongside local makerspaces i3Detroit and All Hands Active, Penguicon has offered instruction in learning to solder electronic components, which allowed attendees to create their own LED badges.

Over a thousand participants have attended past conventions, which have featured Guests of Honor from Neil Gaiman and John Scalzi to Jon "maddog" Hall and Eric S. Raymond.

Recent events 

For the 2014 convention, the Penguicon tech track's focus was on privacy and cryptography. Guests of Honor included Ernie Cline, author of Ready Player One; and Eva Galperin of the Electronic Frontier Foundation.

Philanthropy 
Penguicon was listed as a Guardian of Wildlife at the Detroit Zoo in 2013 for donating to symbolically adopt a penguin.

In 2013, Penguicon listed the New Beginnings Animal Rescue as their official charity, and Penguicon members donated $700 and 123 pounds of food during the convention weekend.

Penguicon was also a sponsor of MHacks III, a weekend-long hackathon held in Detroit in January 2014.

The organization Enabling the Future, which constructs 3D printed prosthetic hands for those in need, was Penguicon's 2015 Hack of Honor and official sponsored charity.  Along with collecting donations, Penguicon worked with Enabling the Future and community members to 3D print limbs leading up to and during the 2015 convention.

Featured guests 

Every year, Penguicon invites a dozen or more people (authors, hackers, and entertainers) who are not full Guests of Honor, but are celebrities in their own right, and calls them Featured Guests (formerly "Nifty Guests").  They also invite former Guests of Honor as "Guest of Honor Emeritus".  In 2010, this included author Jim C. Hines, musician Tom Smith, and open source advocate Eric S. Raymond.

Wil Wheaton's cancellations 

Penguicon has invited Wil Wheaton as a guest of honor multiple times, but he has had to cancel each time. In 2009, Wheaton had to cancel the morning of the convention and wrote an apology letter which was read aloud at Opening Ceremonies.

Tron Guy 

Jay Maynard debuted his self-made electroluminescent Tron Guy costume at Penguicon in 2004.  After submitting photos of himself to Slashdot, he appeared in costume on Jimmy Kimmel Live.  He has also been on America's Got Talent and a commercial for Duck Brand duct tape. Maynard says he "hasn't missed a Penguicon, and doesn't intend to."

List of Guests of Honor

In the media 

A Science Channel show, Outrageous Acts of Science, replayed a video from Penguicon 2006 in which Nifty Guest Howard Tayler recorded attendees dumping the remains of a dewar of liquid nitrogen into the hotel swimming pool.  In 2010, Howard Tayler returned to Penguicon as a Guest of Honor and hosted a second video involving liquid nitrogen and the hotel swimming pool.

See also 

 Science fiction convention

References

External links 
 Penguicon Website
 Penguicon Facebook community
 EncycloPenguicon

Computer clubs
Linux conferences
Science fiction conventions in the United States